The 2021 Worthing Borough Council election took place on 6 May 2021 to elect members of Worthing Borough Council, on the same day as other UK local elections. This election was originally scheduled to take place on 7 May 2020, but was delayed a year due to the COVID-19 pandemic; 2021 was originally scheduled to be an off-year for Worthing Borough Council elections. A third of the council was up for election, a total of 13 councillors. Candidates elected in 2016 had their term expire at this election.

The Conservative Party was seeking to maintain its majority, which it had held in the town since 2004. In the 2018 election, the Labour Party emerged as the largest opposition party in Worthing; this election was the first since the incorporation of the Borough Council in 1974 in which it was technically possible for Labour to win a majority.

The Labour Party and The Conservative Party won 6 seats each in this election, with the Liberal Democrats winning 1. Labour gained 5 seats and held 1; a net gain of 5 seats. The Conservatives lost 5 seats to Labour, but gained one from UKIP in Northbrook Ward, and held 5; a net loss of 4 seats. The Liberal Democrats held on to their seat in Tarring Ward.

The Conservative majority was cut to 1. With a Conservative councillor then becoming an independent and a loss in a by-election, it would become a minority administration before the 2022 elections.

Results summary

Ward results

Broadwater

Castle

Central

Durrington

This ward had no election in 2019, so changes are shown from 2018.

Gaisford

Goring

Heene

Marine

Northbrook

This ward had no election in 2019, so changes are shown from 2018.

Offington

Salvington

Selden

Tarring

By-elections

Marine

Notes

References

Worthing
2021
May 2021 events in the United Kingdom
2020s in West Sussex